KS Steel is a permanent magnetic steel with three times the magnetic reluctance of tungsten steel, which was developed in 1917 by the Japanese scientist and inventor Kotaro Honda. "KS" stands for Kichizaemon Sumitomo, the head of the family-run conglomerate, who provided financial support for the research leading to KS Steel's invention. Honda would go on to invent NKS steel in 1933 whose magnetic resistance is several times higher than that of KS Steel.

History 
After World War one when Japan faced a problem of coping with painful restrictions on imports of materials from foreign countries such as Germany. That is when physicist Kotaro Honda was motivated to study alloy for this need in domestic steel production and opened up his RIKEN-Honda Laboratory at Tohoku Imperial University in 1922. He invented KS steel in 1917; it is a permanent magnetic steel with three times the magnetic resistance of tungsten steel. Kichizaemon Sumitomo, who was the head of the family run that provided financial support for the research leading to the invention, gives the initials KS in the name of the steel.

Material properties 
The composition of KS steel is 0.4–0.8 percent carbon; 30–40 percent cobalt; 5–9 percent tungsten; and 1.5–3 percent chromium. KS steel is best tempered when heated to 950 °C and then quenched in heavy oil. The residual magnetism is reduced by only 6 percent when artificially aged. The yield strength of KS steel is above 500 and tensile strength is above 620 and elongation is above 14. The maximum energy product (BH)max of KS steel is 30 kJ/m^3.

See also
 MKM steel
 RIKEN
 Ten Japanese Great Inventors

References

Steels
Japanese inventions
1917 introductions
Magnetic alloys
Ferromagnetic materials